Liverpool is the second and final studio album by British synth-pop band Frankie Goes to Hollywood, released in October 1986. It would be the band's final album of all-new material, and lead singer Holly Johnson would leave the band following the corresponding world tour, followed by a flurry of lawsuits from ZTT. The album's production was handled by Trevor Horn's engineer Stephen Lipson, who urged the band to play their own instruments on this album (Horn having replaced many of the band's performances and arrangements with his session musicians or his own performances on Welcome to the Pleasuredome). Liverpool therefore features a heavier rock sound than its predecessor. Frankie Goes to Hollywood has not released any more studio albums since Liverpool.

The album was a commercial disappointment compared to the band's previous effort, though it charted generally high at No. 5 in the United Kingdom and Germany, No. 7 on the Austrian and Swiss music charts and No. 8 in Norway. The cover photo was different depending on what format was purchased (LP, cassette, or compact disc). It also produced the top 5 single "Rage Hard" (No. 1 in Germany), top 20 single "Warriors of the Wasteland" and top 30 single "Watching the Wildlife".

Critical reception
The Rolling Stone Album Guide wrote: "Like most of the era's one-hit wonders, the group did make a second album, though God only knows why anyone would want to hear it."

Track listing

Deluxe edition 
In 2011, a remastered deluxe edition of Liverpool was released, featuring a second disc containing rare and previously unreleased material. The first CD contains the LP version of the original album with extra tracks and the second CD rare and unreleased tracks. A few tracks were removed off later issues due to complaints by the band members. Issues with those tracks are "number 15 in the Element Series", and those without are "number 19 in the Element Series".

CD1
 "Warriors of the Wasteland" – 4:54
 "Rage Hard" – 5:08
 "Kill the Pain" – 6:16
 "Maximum Joy" – 5:30
 "Watching the Wildlife" – 4:19
 "Lunar Bay" – 5:42
 "For Heaven's Sake" – 4:30
 "Is Anybody Out There?" – 7:28
 "The Waves" – 2:44
 "Pamela" (Spoken) – 0:22
 "Pocket Vibrator" (Monitor Mix Sarm Sessions October 1986) – 3:31 (early copies only)
 "Suffragette City" – 3:35
 "Roadhouse Blues" – 4:06
 "(I Can't Get No) Satisfaction" (Monitor Mix Sarm Sessions May 1986, Voiceless) – 4:50
 "(Don't Lose What's Left) of Your Little Mind" – 6:14
 "Rage Hard" (Voiceless) – 5:07

CD2
 "Rage Hard" (Montreux Mix) – 5:34
 "Warriors of the Wasteland" (Montreux Mix) – 3:19
 "Warriors Cassetted" – 19:58
 "Drum Loop" (Monitor Mix Wisseloord Sessions November 1985) – 3:19 (early copies only)
 "Fuck Off" (Monitor Mix / Wisseloord Sessions / November 1985) – 4:01 (early copies only)
 "Wildlife Cassetted" – 24:26
 "Our Silver Turns to Gold" (Monitor Mix Ibiza Sessions May 1985) – 3:44
 "Delirious" (Monitor Mix Ibiza Sessions October 1985) – 3:12
 "Stan" (Spoken) – 0:42
 "For Heaven's Sake" (Monitor Mix Wisseloord Sessions March 1986) – 7:54

Singles 
 "Rage Hard"
 "Warriors of the Wasteland"
 "Watching the Wildlife"

Personnel
Frankie Goes to Hollywood
Holly Johnson – lead vocals
Paul Rutherford – backing vocals
Brian Nash – guitar
Mark O'Toole – bass guitar
Peter Gill – drums

Additional personnel
Trevor Horn – executive producer
Betsy Cook – backing vocals 
Barry Diament – mastering
Stephen Lipson – guitar, keyboards, producer
Steve Howe, Trevor Rabin – guitar
Heff Moraes – assistant engineer
Richard Niles – string arrangements, brass arrangement
Andy Richards, Peter-John Vettese – keyboards
Anton Corbijn – photography

Charts

Weekly charts

Year-end charts

Certifications

References 

1986 albums
Frankie Goes to Hollywood albums
Albums produced by Trevor Horn
Albums produced by Stephen Lipson
ZTT Records albums